Caroline Morris Galt (November 6, 1875 – January 17, 1937) was an American college professor. She taught Greek, Latin, art history and archaeology courses at Mount Holyoke College, and was the first woman appointed as an annual professor at the American School of Classical Studies at Athens.

Early life and education 
Galt was born in Aurora, Illinois, the daughter of Thomas Galt and Jeannette McFarlane Galt. Her mother was born in Glasgow, Scotland.

Caroline Galt earned a bachelor's degree at Bryn Mawr College in 1897, and pursued further studies at the University of Chicago and Columbia University. She was enrolled at the American School of Classical Studies in Rome in 1910 and 1911.

Career 
Galt taught Greek and mathematics at the Pennsylvania College for Women in Pittsburgh after college. She was on the faculty at Mount Holyoke College from 1903 to 1937. She taught Greek and Latin, and took over much of the work of art history and archaeology professor Louise Fitz Randolph in 1913. Her sisters, Mary Wallace Galt and Jeannette Rachel Galt, also taught at Mount Holyoke (mathematics and Latin, respectively).

Galt published articles on "a bronze statuette whose monumental beauty alone merits publication", on "a sculptured marble fragment" from Aptera, and on the "secluded life led by Greek women of the Hellenic Period". In 1924 she toured through several northeastern states lecturing on "The Romans in Egypt."

Galt organized the Mount Holyoke Friends of Art. In 1925, she was the first woman appointed as an annual professor at the American School of Classical Studies at Athens. She was a member of the Classical League, the Archaeological Institute of America, the American Philological Association, and the American Numismatic Society. One of her students at Mount Holyoke was archaeologist Sara Anderson Immerwahr.

Personal life 
Galt died in 1937, aged 61 years, from cancer, in South Hadley, Massachusetts.

References

External links 

 Clark, Austin. "Ancient Art and Modern Women: Louise Fitz-Randolph, Caroline Galt, and the Professionalization of Art History at Mount Holyoke College." (Master's thesis, University of Massachusetts 2017).

1875 births
1937 deaths
Classics educators
Bryn Mawr College alumni
Mount Holyoke College faculty
American School of Classical Studies at Athens
People from Aurora, Illinois